Pacode is a panchayat town in Kanniyakumari district in the Indian state of Tamil Nadu.

Demographics
 India census, Pacode had a population of 22,521. Males constituted 51% of the population and females 49%. Pacode had an average literacy rate of 76%, higher than the national average of 59.5%: male literacy was 79%, and female literacy was 72%. In Pacode, 11% of the population was under 6 years of age.

Important places
Gnaramvilai, Thickurichy, Alauvilai, and Melpuram, Chitharal Jain Monuments are important places in Pacode.

Schools
Abraham James Memorial Matriculation School, Gnaramvilai, Pacode
Sacred Heart Higher Secondary School, Pacode

Religion
There are several temples and churches here.

References

Cities and towns in Kanyakumari district